"Mornin'" is a 1983 hit song by Al Jarreau, billed simply as 'Jarreau'. It was the first of three single releases from his sixth studio album, Jarreau.  The song's music video was mostly animated, with Jarreau himself starring in a live-action role.

"Mornin'" again reached the music charts in 2006 when Jarreau reworked the song with George Benson on their collaborative album Givin' It Up.  "Mornin'" reached #1 on the US Jazz chart.

Chart history

References

External links
 

1983 songs
1983 singles
Warner Records singles
Al Jarreau songs
Songs written by Roger Murrah
Songs written by Keith Stegall
Songs written by David Foster
Songs written by Jay Graydon